Kienersrüti is a former municipality in the administrative district of Thun in the canton of Bern in Switzerland.  On 1 January 2014 the former municipality of Kienersrüti merged into the municipality of Uttigen.

It was the third-smallest independent municipality in the canton. It is rural in character and its economy based mostly on farming. A regional popular saying names it "the one street lantern town".

Geography
Of this area,  or 87.8% is used for agricultural purposes, while  or 12.2% is forested. Of the rest of the land,  or 2.7% is settled (buildings or roads).

Of the built up area, housing and buildings made up 2.7% and transportation infrastructure made up 0.0%.  12.2% of the total land area is heavily forested.  Of the agricultural land, 48.6% is used for growing crops and 35.1% is pastures, while 4.1% is used for orchards or vine crops.

Demographics
Kienersrüti had a population (as of 2011) of 52.  Over the last 10 years the population has decreased at a rate of -9.1%.  All of the population speaks German.

In the 2007 election the most popular party was the SPS which received 30% of the vote.  The next three most popular parties were the SVP (29.3%), the local small left-wing parties (14.3%) and the Green Party (8.9%).

The age distribution of the population is children and teenagers (0–19 years old) make up 13.5% of the population, while adults (20–64 years old) make up 71.2% and seniors (over 64 years old) make up 15.4%. In Kienersrüti about 80.6% of the population (between age 25-64) have completed either non-mandatory upper secondary education or additional higher education (either university or a Fachhochschule).

Kienersrüti has an unemployment rate of 0%.  , there were 24 people employed in the primary economic sector and about 6 businesses involved in this sector.  1 person is employed in the secondary sector and there is 1 business in this sector.  No one is employed in the tertiary sector.
The historical population is given in the following table:

References

External links

https://web.archive.org/web/20041211091826/http://www.thun-west.ch/region/kienersrueti.htm (in German)

Former municipalities of the canton of Bern